Pukasavilivili or Tepuka Vili Vili is an islet of Funafuti, Tuvalu.

Tepuka Vili Vili is part of the Funafuti Conservation Area, established in 1996 with the aim of preserving the natural fauna and flora of the area.

Tepuka Vili Vili was devastated by Cyclone Meli in 1979, with all its vegetation and most of its sand swept away during the cyclone.

Te Ava Kum Kum is the passage through the Funafuti atoll of the western rim, south of Te Ava Tepuka Vili, between the islets of Tepuka Vili Vili to the north and Fualopa immediately south.

References

Islands of Tuvalu
Pacific islands claimed under the Guano Islands Act
Funafuti